Centre Square Mall, is a shopping mall in the city centre of Kochi in Kerala, India. Located at the heart of the city on the MG Road, the mall is spread over 2.5 acres and is owned and operated by Peevees Projects.

Centre Square Mall caters to the crowd of Kerala, with an indulgence in Shopping, Food, Entertainment & Leisure by providing a Unique Experience for the entire family, making it the destination mall for entire Kerala. Launched in 2013 & located in the heart of Kochi city, the mall offers retail space close to 5 lac sqft and a superior tenant mix featuring the best national and international brands. With anchor stores like Centro, Smart Bazaar, Max and Reliance Trends, 3 level of basement parking, Cafes and Multi-cuisine Restaurants; it ensures a good mix of vital FEC and F&B in addition to lifestyle.

Location

Centre Square is located at the heart of the city on the Mahatma-Gandhi Road, MG Road, Kochi, Kerala and is well connected to the nearest Kochi metro station  "Maharajas College" (walking distance of less than 1 km).

Full Address:

Centre Square Mall

Peevees Projects Pvt. Ltd. 

66/6284, Rajaji Junction, 

M.G Road, Kochi - 682035

Kerala, India

Features

 Centro store spread over 4 floors
 Smart Bazaar spread over 2 floors
 Anchor stores & other lifestyle retail
 Food Court with multi cuisine outlets
 7D Cinema
 3 level basement parking
 Connectivity to Kochi Metro

Mall Timings & Contact
Monday: 10 AM to 10 PM
Tuesday: 10 AM to 10 PM
Wednesday: 10 AM to 10 PM
Thursday: 10 AM to 10 PM
Friday: 10 AM to 10 PM
Saturday: 10 AM to 10 PM
Sunday: 10 AM to 10 PM
Open on holidays 
Opening & timings are subject to government directives and may change on certain dates
Helpdesk: (+91) 484 4041 888
Contact: info@centresquarekochi.com

References

External links
 Centre Square Kochi Website
 Centre Square Kochi FB page
 Centre Square Kochi Instagram

Shopping malls in Kochi
2013 establishments in Kerala
Shopping malls established in 2013
Tourist attractions in Kochi
Tourist attractions in Ernakulam district